Cueva de Villa Luz (English: Cave of the Lighted House), also known as Cueva del Azufre and Cueva de las Sardinas, is a cave near Tapijulapa in the southern Mexican state of Tabasco. The springs within the cave are rich in hydrogen sulfide, a gas that is a potent respiratory toxicant and smells like rotten eggs. Within the water sulfide is oxidized to colloidal sulfur which gives the water a milky appearance, and creates sulfuric acid. The cave is essentially a maze about two kilometers in length and primarily etched out of limestone by the sulfuric acid in the water. Hydrogen sulfide is also used by chemoautotrophic bacteria, which form the base of the food web.

The cave is a popular tourist destination and visited by many, partly because it is easily accessible. It has been featured on the BBC's series Planet Earth, and Wonders of the Solar System.

External links
 Hose L. D., Pisarowicz J. A. (1999) Cueva de Villa Luz, Tabasco, Mexico: reconnaissance study of an active sulfur spring cave and ecosystem. Journal of Cave and Karst Studies 61(1): 13–21.
Cueva de Villa Luz Biological Investigations
Cueva de Villa Luz at ShowCave
National Geographic Magazine,  Mexico's Poisonous Cave
New Scientist Magazine, Acid House, 6 June 1998
Research on cave mollies
Research using the Cueva de Villa Luz
New Scientist Magazine, Religious rite gives evolution a helping hand, 18 September 2010

Caves of Mexico
Limestone caves
Wild caves
Landforms of Tabasco